Old boy or Oldboy or Old Boys may refer to:

 Old Boys, male former pupils of schools in Britain, some schools in Australia, Canada, India, New Zealand, Trinidad and Tobago
 Old boy network, social and business connections among former pupils of top male-only schools
 A cadet who has attended St. John's Military School

Films
 Oldboy (2003 film), South Korean film based on the manga, directed by Park Chan-wook
 Oldboy (2013 film), American remake of the 2003 South Korean film, directed by Spike Lee
 Old Boys (2010 film), Chinese short comedy film
 Old Boys: The Way of the Dragon, 2014 Chinese film
 Old Boys (2018 film), British film directed by Toby MacDonald

People
 "Old Boy", nom de guerre of Australian sports journalist Reginald Wilmot (1869–1949) 

Sports teams and clubs
 BSC Old Boys, Basel, Switzerland
 Newell's Old Boys, Argentine football club
 Old Boys' AFC, semi-professional football team based in Invercargill, New Zealand
 Old Boys & Old Girls Club, Montevideo, Uruguay

Other
 Old Boy (manga), manga series
 Old Boy (TV series), Chinese television series

See also